Chatra Ramai Pandit Mahavidyalaya is a general degree college in  Chatra, PO Darapur, Kotulpur Block,  Bankura district, India, established in 2000. The college offers undergraduate courses in arts and sciences. It is affiliated to  Bankura University.

Accreditation
The college is recognized by the University Grants Commission (UGC). 

The college is also affiliated by Bankura University (Formerly under The University of Burdwan).

See also

References

External links
 

Universities and colleges in Bankura district
Colleges affiliated to Bankura University
Educational institutions established in 2000
2000 establishments in West Bengal